Guatemalan Revolutionary Workers Party (in Spanish: Partido Revolucionario Obrero Guatemalteco) was a communist party in Guatemala. PROG was founded in 1950, following a split from the Communist Party of Guatemala (PCG). PROG made its first public appearance on July 1. PROG was led by Víctor Manuel Gutiérrez. The split in PCG had been provoked by discussions on the socio-economic composition of the Central Committee.

Gutiérrez, returning from a stay in Eastern Europe, declared the dissolution of PROG on February 2, 1952. The Central Committee of PROG declared that the party members were free to choose their future political course, but recommended them to join PCG. Gutiérrez joined PCG, and was elected Central Committee member of PCG.

References

Political parties established in 1950
Communist parties in Guatemala
Defunct political parties in Guatemala
1950 establishments in Guatemala
Political parties disestablished in 1952
1952 disestablishments in Guatemala